Pedro María Ñancúpel Alarcón (Terao, 1837 – Castro, 11 November 1888) was a pirate and outlaw active in the archipelagoes of Chiloé, Guaitecas and other places in the fjords and channels of Patagonia in the 1880s. Ñancupel was captured in Melinka in 1886 and bought into justice in Ancud the same year. After escaping from detainment in Ancud he was captured once again and executed by firing squad on November 11, 1888. He was said at the time to have killed 99 persons.

References

19th-century pirates
1837 births
1888 deaths
Chilean outlaws
Mapuche sailors
People from Chiloé Province
People executed for piracy
Chilean people convicted of murder
Huilliche people
Pirates